The Gradient BiOnyx is a Czech two-place, paraglider designed and produced by Gradient sro of Prague. It is no longer  in production.

Design and development
The BiOnyx was designed as a tandem glider for flight training, the Bi naming indicating "bi-place" or two seater.

The glider is AFNOR biplace certified.

Specifications (BiOnyx)

References

BiOnyx
Paragliders